Jean-Louis de Lolme or Delolme (174016 July 1806) was a Genevan and British political theorist and writer on constitutional matters, born in the then independent Republic of Geneva. As an adult he moved to England, and became a British subject. His most famous work was Constitution de l'Angleterre (The Constitution of England, 1771), which was subsequently published in English as well. In it, de Lolme advocated a constitutional form of government enshrining the principle that monarchy, aristocracy and democracy should be balanced against each other. He also praised the element of representative democracy in the constitution, and urged an extension of suffrage. The work influenced many of the framers of the United States Constitution.

Early life
De Lolme was born in the then independent Republic of Geneva in 1740. He studied for the bar, and had begun to practise law when he was obliged to emigrate on account of a pamphlet he wrote entitled Examen de trois parts de droit (Examination of Three Parts of Rights), which gave offence to the authorities of the town. He took refuge in England, where he lived for several years on the meagre and precarious income derived from occasional contributions to various journals.

Writing career

During his protracted exile in England, De Lolme made a careful study of the English constitution, the results of which he published in his Constitution de l'Angleterre (The Constitution of England, Amsterdam, 1771), of which an enlarged and improved edition in English appeared in 1775, and was several times reprinted. The work excited much interest as containing many acute observations on the causes of the excellence of the English constitution as compared with those of other countries. However, it was termed by the 11th edition of the Encyclopædia Britannica (1911) as "wanting in breadth of view, being written before the period when constitutional questions were treated in a scientific manner".

In the book, de Lolme advocated a constitutional form of government enshrining the principle of balanced government, balancing the one, the few, and the many, or the ideas of monarchy, aristocracy, and democracy. He criticised the power of the British parliament and coined an expression which became proverbial: "parliament can do everything but make a woman a man and a man a woman". Nonetheless, de Lolme extolled the British government because, in his view, which was influenced by his own observations and study as well as by the previous writings of Voltaire and Montesquieu, the unwritten constitution of the United Kingdom embodied the ideal of balanced government better than any other government of the time. In particular, he praised the element of representative democracy in the constitution, and urged an extension of suffrage. De Lolme developed and refined his political thinking to a large extent in opposition to the more radical theory of direct democracy advocated by his compatriot, Jean-Jacques Rousseau, whom he accused of being unrealistic. De Lolme is sometimes identified as a probable candidate for being the person behind the pseudonymous political commentator Junius.

De Lolme also wrote in English A Parallel between the English Government and the Former Government of Sweden (1772); The History of the Flagellants (c. 1776), based upon a work by Nicolas Boileau-Despréaux; An Essay, Containing a Few Strictures on the Union of Scotland with England (1787); and one or two smaller works.

Later life
In 1775, de Lolme found himself compelled to accept aid from a charitable society to enable him to return home. He died at Seewen, a village in the Canton of Schwyz, on 16 July 1806.

Legacy
De Lolme's Constitution de l'Angleterre, along with a translation of David Hume's History of England (1754–1761), supplied philosophers of the time with most of their ideas about the English constitution. It was therefore used somewhat as a political pamphlet. The work influenced many of the framers of the United States Constitution. One Founding Father who was not present in Philadelphia, but whose Defence of the Constitutions of Government of the United States (1787) influenced the delegates there, was John Adams, who praised De Lolme's book as one of the best on the subject of constitutionalism ever written. Some have argued that De Lolme's work also influenced the Constitution of Norway.

Selected works
. Later editions:
.
.
.
.
.
.

Notes

References

 

1740 births
1804 deaths
18th-century writers from the Republic of Geneva
Enlightenment philosophers
British philosophers
British male writers
British legal professionals
British political philosophers
18th-century British philosophers
18th-century English male writers